The 1957 Delaware Fightin' Blue Hens football team was an American football team that represented the University of Delaware as an independent during the 1957 NCAA College Division football season. In its seventh season under head coach David M. Nelson, the team compiled a 4–3 record and outscored opponents by a total of 210 to 84. Joe Harvanik was the team captain. 

Delaware did not play its scheduled date with Lafayette on Oct. 12, as an outbreak of Asian flu affecting more than 20 of the Leopards' players prompted them to cancel the game.

The Blue Hens played their home games at Delaware Stadium on the university campus in Newark, Delaware.

Schedule

References

Delaware
Delaware Fightin' Blue Hens football seasons
Delaware Fightin' Blue Hens football